Atavism or atavistic is a concept in biology and in culture.

It may also refer to:
 a record label
 an album by the Slough Feg
 an album by the Otep